The 1939 Memorial Cup final was the 21st junior ice hockey championship of the Canadian Amateur Hockey Association. The George Richardson Memorial Trophy champions Oshawa Generals of the Ontario Hockey Association in Eastern Canada competed against the Abbott Cup champions Edmonton Athletic Club Roamers of the Edmonton Junior Hockey League in Western Canada. In a best-of-five series, held at Maple Leaf Gardens in Toronto, Ontario, Oshawa won their 1st Memorial Cup, defeating Edmonton 3 games to 1.

Scores
Game 1: Oshawa 9-4 Edmonton
Game 2: Oshawa 12-4 Edmonton
Game 3: Edmonton 4-1 Oshawa
Game 4: Oshawa 4-2 Edmonton

Winning roster
Les Colvin, Don Daniels, Joe Delmonte, Jim Drummond, Gerry Kinsella, Nick Knott, Jud McAtee, Norm McAtee, Dinny McManus, Gar Peters, Nig Ritchie, Roy Sawyer, Orville Smith, Billy Taylor.  Coach: Tracy Shaw.

References

External links
 Memorial Cup
 Canadian Hockey League

1938–39 in Canadian ice hockey
Memorial Cup tournaments
Ice hockey competitions in Toronto
1930s in Toronto